Bermagui River is an open and trained semi-mature wave dominated barrier estuary or perennial river located in the South Coast region of New South Wales, Australia.

Course and features
Formed by the confluence of the Coolagolite Creek and Nutleys Creek, near Bermagui South, the Bermagui River flows generally east, before reaching its mouth into the Tasman Sea of the South Pacific Ocean near Bermagui. The river descends  over its  course.

The name of the river is derived from the Aboriginal Dyirringanj word, spelled variously as permageua and bermaguee, meaning a canoe with paddles.

See also

 Rivers of New South Wales
 List of rivers of New South Wales (A–K)
 List of rivers of Australia

References

External links
 

 
 

Rivers of New South Wales
South Coast (New South Wales)